Donald Graham Burt is an American production designer.  He has worked on multiple films including The Joy Luck Club, Dangerous Minds, and Donnie Brasco, as well as with David Fincher on Zodiac in 2007. In 2008, he designed the sets for The Curious Case of Benjamin Button which won an Academy Award for Best Art Direction in 2009, an Art Directors Guild Award for Best Achievement in Art Direction, and a BAFTA Film Award for Best Production Design, along with receiving a nomination for a Satellite Award for Best Art Direction & Production Design. In 2020, Burt won an Academy Award for David Fincher's black-and-white biographical drama film Mank.

Burt is a 1976 graduate of Independence (Kansas) High School and studied art at the University of Arizona.

Filmography
Mank (2020)
Outlaw King (2018)
Hostiles (2017)
Gone Girl (2014)
The Girl with the Dragon Tattoo (2011)
The Social Network (2010)
The Curious Case of Benjamin Button (2008)
It Might Get Loud (2008)
Zodiac (2007)
In an Instant (2005)
Because of Winn-Dixie (2005)
White Oleander (2002)
The Center of the World (2001)
Anywhere But Here (1999)
A Cool, Dry Place (1998)
Donnie Brasco (1997)
Kazaam (1996)
Dangerous Minds (1995)
The Joy Luck Club (1993)

Awards & nomination
 2009 Academy Award for Best Art Direction
 2009 Art Directors Guild Award for Best Achievement in Art Direction
 2009 BAFTA Film Award for Best Production Design
 2009 Satellite Award nomination for Best Art Direction & Production Design
 2021 Academy Award for Best Production Design

References

External links

Living people
University of Arizona alumni
American production designers
Best Art Direction Academy Award winners
Best Production Design BAFTA Award winners
Year of birth missing (living people)